Vitrenko is a Ukrainian surname. Notable people with the surname include:

 Nataliya Vitrenko (born 1951), Ukrainian politician
 Yuriy Vitrenko (born 1976), Ukrainian economist

See also
 

Ukrainian-language surnames